Proceedings of the Human Factors and Ergonomics Society Annual Meeting is an annual peer-reviewed academic journal that covers research in the field of ergonomics. It has been in publication since 1974 and is currently published by SAGE Publications in association with the Human Factors and Ergonomics Society.

Abstracting and indexing 
Proceedings of the Human Factors and Ergonomics Society Annual Meeting is abstracted and indexed in:
 E-psyche
 ProQuest

External links 

SAGE Publishing academic journals
English-language journals
Engineering journals
Annual journals
Publications established in 1957